Lin Chi-liang (born 27 September 1959) is a Taiwanese alpine skier. He competed at the 1984 Winter Olympics and the 1988 Winter Olympics.

References

1959 births
Living people
Taiwanese male alpine skiers
Olympic alpine skiers of Taiwan
Alpine skiers at the 1984 Winter Olympics
Alpine skiers at the 1988 Winter Olympics
Place of birth missing (living people)